The monarchy of Jamaica is a constitutional system of government in which a hereditary monarch is the sovereign and head of state of Jamaica. The terms Crown in Right of Jamaica, His Majesty in Right of Jamaica, or The King in Right of Jamaica may also be used to refer to the entire executive of the government of Jamaica. Though the Jamaican Crown has its roots in the British Crown, it has evolved to become a distinctly Jamaican institution, represented by its own unique symbols.

The present monarch is King Charles III—officially titled King of Jamaica—who has reigned since 8 September 2022. He and other members of the Royal Family undertake various public and private functions across Jamaica and on behalf of the country abroad. However, the King is the only member of the Royal Family with any constitutional role, holding ultimate executive authority, though his Royal Prerogative remains bound by laws enacted by his predecessor in parliament and by conventions and precedents, leaving the day-to-day exercise of executive power to his Cabinet. While several powers are the sovereign's alone, most of the royal constitutional and ceremonial duties in Jamaica are carried out by the King's representative, the governor-general.

The King, besides reigning in Jamaica, separately serves as monarch for each of fourteen other Commonwealth realms. This developed from the former colonial relationship of these countries to Britain, now independent each realm of the Commonwealth is legally distinct. Since Jamaica's independence in 1962, there is frequent debate on whether to replace the monarchy with a republic, a position which is supported by both major political parties.

International and domestic aspects 

Jamaica has the same person as their monarch as other Commonwealth realms. Each country is sovereign and independent of the others, meaning the Jamaican monarchy has both a separate and a shared character, and the monarchy has also thus ceased to be an exclusively British institution, although it has often been called British since this time (in both legal and common language) for reasons historical, political, and of convenience. On all matters of the Jamaican state, the monarch is advised solely by Jamaican Ministers of the Crown. and, effective with the Jamaica Independence Act, 1962, no British or other realm government can advise the monarch on matters pertinent to Jamaica.

Given these arrangements, it is considered impossible for the monarch of Jamaica to receive an ambassador from, or send an ambassador to, any country of which he or she is also monarch; essentially sending an ambassador to him or herself. Instead, the practice of sending High Commissioners developed, wherein an individual is sent to be a representative in one realm of the government in another.

Title and style
The shared and domestic aspects of the Crown are also highlighted in the sovereign's Jamaican title, currently Charles the Third, by the Grace of God, King of Jamaica and of His other Realms and Territories, Head of the Commonwealth. The sovereign's role specifically as King of Jamaica, as well as his status as monarch of other nations, is communicated by mentioning Jamaica separately from, but along with, the King's other lands. Typically, the sovereign is styled King of Jamaica, and is addressed as such when in Jamaica or performing duties on behalf of Jamaica abroad.

Financing

The sovereign only draws from Jamaican coffers for support in the performance of his duties when in Jamaica or acting as King of Jamaica abroad; Jamaicans do not pay any money to the King, either towards personal income or to support royal residences outside Jamaica. This applies equally to other members of the royal family. Normally, tax dollars pay only for the costs associated with the governor-general in the exercise of the powers of the Crown, including travel, security, residences, offices, ceremonies, and the like.

Succession

Succession is by absolute primogeniture governed by the provisions of the Succession to the Crown Act 2013, as well as the Act of Settlement 1701, and the Bill of Rights 1689. This legislation limits the succession to the natural (i.e. non-adopted), legitimate descendants of Sophia, Electress of Hanover, and stipulates that the monarch cannot be a Roman Catholic, nor married to one, and must be in communion with the Church of England upon ascending the throne. Though these constitutional laws, as they apply to Jamaica, still lie within the control of the British parliament, via adopting the Statute of Westminster both the United Kingdom and Jamaica agreed not to change the rules of succession without the unanimous consent of the other realms, unless explicitly leaving the shared monarchy relationship; a situation that applies identically in all the other realms, and which has been likened to a treaty amongst these countries. Thus, Jamaica's line of succession remains identical to that of the United Kingdom.

Upon a demise of the Crown (the death or abdication of a sovereign) it is customary for the accession of the new monarch to be publicly proclaimed by the governor-general. Regardless of any proclamations, the late sovereign's heir immediately and automatically succeeds, without any need for confirmation or further ceremony; hence arises the phrase "The king is dead, long live the king!" Following an appropriate period of mourning, the monarch is also crowned in the United Kingdom, though this ritual is not necessary for a sovereign to reign; for example, Edward VIII was never crowned, yet was undoubtedly king during his short time on the throne. All incumbent viceroys, judges, civil servants, legislators, military officers, etc., are not affected by the death of the monarch. After an individual ascends the throne, he or she typically continues to reign until death. Monarchs are not allowed to unilaterally abdicate; the only monarch to abdicate, Edward VIII, did so before Jamaica was independent, and, even then, only with the authorization of specials Acts of Parliament in the Dominions.

Personification of the state

Since the independence of Jamaica, the sovereign's role as monarch of Jamaica has been recognized and promoted as separate from his or her position as monarch of the United Kingdom. The sovereign is regarded as the personification, or legal personality, of the Jamaican state. Therefore, the state is referred to as His Majesty the King in Right of Jamaica; for example, if a lawsuit is filed against the government, the respondent is formally described as His Majesty the King in Right of Jamaica, or simply King (if male) or Regina (if female). As such, the monarch is the owner of all state lands (called Crown land), buildings and equipment (called Crown held property), state-owned companies (called Crown Corporations), and the copyright for all government publications (called Crown copyright), as well as guardianship of foster children (called Crown wards), in his or her position as sovereign, and not as an individual. Government staff are also employed by the monarch, as are the governor-general, judges, members of the Jamaica Defence Force, police officers, and parliamentarians, who all technically work for the monarch. 

Many employees of the Crown were once required by law to recite an oath of allegiance to the monarch before taking their posts, in reciprocation to the sovereign's Coronation Oath, wherein he or she promises "to govern the Peoples of ... Jamaica ... according to their respective laws and customs". Save for that taken by senators, the oaths of allegiance were altered in 2002, removing mention of the monarch.

Constitutional role
Jamaica's constitution is made up of a variety of statutes and conventions that are either British or Jamaican in origin, which gives Jamaica a similar parliamentary system of government to the other Commonwealth realms, wherein the role of the King and the governor-general is both legal and practical. The Crown is regarded as a corporation, in which several parts share the authority of the whole, with the King as the person at the centre of the constitutional construct, meaning all powers of state are constitutionally reposed in the monarch, who is represented by the governor-generalappointed by the monarch on the advice of the Prime Minister of Jamaica. Most of the King's domestic duties are performed by this vice-regal representative, though he is briefed through regular communications from his Jamaican ministers, and holds audience with them whenever possible.

All institutions of government are said to act under the sovereign's authority; the vast powers that belong to the Crown are collectively known as the Royal Prerogative. Parliamentary approval is not required for the exercise of the Royal Prerogative; moreover, the consent of the Crown must be obtained before either of the houses of parliament may even debate a bill affecting the sovereign's prerogatives or interests. While the Royal Prerogative is extensive, it is not unlimited; for example, the monarch does not have the prerogative to impose and collect new taxessuch an action requires the authorization of an Act of Parliament. The government of Jamaica is also thus formally referred to as His Majesty's Government. Further, the constitution instructs that any change to the position of the monarch, or the monarch's representative in Jamaica, requires the consent of a two-thirds majority of each house of parliament.

When Jamaica attained fully responsible status within the Commonwealth provision for the new constitution, with effect from 6 August 1962, was made by The Jamaica (Constitution) Order in Council 1962, under the West Indies Act, 1962 and the Jamaica Independence Act, 1962. The Oath of Allegiance, set out in the First Schedule of the Order in Council, is a declaration of allegiance to "Her Majesty Queen Elizabeth II, Her Heirs and Successors".

Executive (King-in-Council)
In Jamaica's constitutional system, one of the main duties of the Crown is to appoint a prime minister, who thereafter heads the Cabinet and advises the monarch and governor-general on how to execute their executive powers over all aspects of government operations and foreign affairs; this requirement is, unlike in other Commonwealth realms where it is a matter of convention, constitutionally enshrined in Jamaica. Though the monarch's power is still a part of the executive processthe operation of the Cabinet is technically known as the King-in-Council (or Governor-in-Council)the advice tendered is typically binding. Since the death of Queen Anne in 1714, the last monarch to head the British Cabinet, the monarch reigns but does not rule. This means that the monarch's role, and thereby the viceroys' role, is almost entirely symbolic and cultural, acting as a symbol of the legal authority under which all governments and agencies operate, while the Cabinet directs the use of the Royal Prerogative, which includes the privilege to declare war, maintain the King's peace, and direct the actions of the Jamaica Defence Force, as well as to summon and prorogue parliament, and call elections. However, it is important to note that the Royal Prerogative belongs to the Crown, and not to any of the ministers, though it may sometimes appear that way, and the royal figures may unilaterally use these powers in exceptional constitutional crisis situations. There are also a few duties which must be specifically performed by, or bills that require assent by, the King. These include signing the appointment papers of the governor-general, the confirmation of awards of Jamaican honours system, and the approval of any change in her Jamaican title.

In accordance with convention, the monarch or governor-general, to maintain the stability of government, must appoint as prime minister the individual most likely to maintain the support of the House of Representatives: usually the leader of the political party with a majority in that house, but also when no party or coalition holds a majority (referred to as a minority government situation), or other scenarios in which the governor-general's judgement about the most suitable candidate for prime minister has to be brought into play. The governor-general also appoints to the Cabinet the other ministers of the Crown, who are, in turn, accountable to the democratically elected House of Representatives, and through it, to the people. The King is informed by his viceroy of the acceptance of the resignation of a prime minister and the swearing-in of a new prime minister and other members of the ministry.

Members of various executive agencies and other officials are appointed by the Crown. The commissioning of privy councillors, senators, the Speaker of the Senate, Supreme Court justices also falls under the Royal Prerogative, though these duties are specifically assigned to the governor-general by the constitution. Public inquiries are also commissioned by the Crown through a Royal Warrant, and are called Royal Commissions.

Foreign affairs

The Royal Prerogative also extends to foreign affairs: the sovereign or governor-general negotiates and ratifies treaties, alliances, and international agreements. As with other uses of the Royal Prerogative, no parliamentary approval is required; however, a treaty cannot alter the domestic laws of Jamaica; an Act of Parliament is necessary in such cases. The governor-general, on behalf of the King, also accredits Jamaican High Commissioners and ambassadors, and receives diplomats from foreign states.

Parliament (King-in-Parliament)
The sovereign, along with the Senate and the House of Representatives, is one of the three components of Parliament, called the King-in-Parliament. The authority of the Crown therein is embodied in the mace for each house, which both bear a crown at their apex. Per the constitution, the monarch does not, however, participate in the legislative process; the viceroy does, though only in the granting of Royal Assent. Further, the constitution outlines that the governor-general alone is responsible for summoning, proroguing, and dissolving parliament, after which the writs for a general election are usually dropped by the governor-general at Government House. The new parliamentary session is marked by the State Opening of Parliament, during which either the monarch or the governor-general reads the Speech from the Throne. As the monarch and viceroy cannot enter the House of Representatives, this, as well as the bestowing of Royal Assent, takes place in the Senate chamber; Members of Parliament are summoned to these ceremonies from the Commons by the Crown's messenger, the Usher of the Black Rod, after he knocks on the doors of the lower house that have been slammed closed on him, to symbolise the barring of the monarch from the assembly.

All laws in Jamaica are enacted only with the viceroy's granting of Royal Assent; usually done by the governor-general, with the Broad Seal of Jamaica. Thus, all bills begin with the phrase "BE IT ENACTED by The King's Most Excellent Majesty, by and with the advice and consent of the Senate and House of Representatives of Jamaica, and by the authority of the same, as follows..."

Courts (King-on-the-Bench)

The sovereign is deemed the fount of justice, and is responsible for rendering justice for all subjects, known in this role as the King on the Bench. However, he or she does not personally rule in judicial cases; instead, judicial functions are performed in his or her name by what are termed His Majesty's Justices of the Peace. Hence, the common law holds that the sovereign "can do no wrong"; the monarch cannot be prosecuted in his or her own courts for criminal offences. Civil lawsuits against the Crown in its public capacity (that is, lawsuits against the government) are permitted; however, lawsuits against the monarch personally are not cognizable. In international cases, as a sovereign and under established principles of international law, the King of Jamaica is not subject to suit in foreign courts without his express consent. The sovereign, and by extension the governor-general, also exercises the prerogative of mercy, and may pardon offences against the Crown, either before, during, or after a trial. In addition, the monarch also serves as a symbol of the legitimacy of courts of justice, and of their judicial authority. An image of the King or the coat of arms of Jamaica is always displayed in Jamaican courtrooms.

Cultural aspects

Royal tours

Elizabeth II visited Jamaica on six occasions. She first visited the island on November 1953. She also toured the island in 1962, March 1966, April 1975, February 1983, March 1994, and February 2002.

At Jamaica's independence celebrations in 1962, the Queen of Jamaica was represented by her sister Princess Margaret, where she opened the first session of the Parliament of Jamaica on behalf of The Queen.

The Queen visited Jamaica again in March 1966. The same year Prince Philip, Duke of Edinburgh, accompanied by his son, Charles, Prince of Wales, toured Jamaica as part of his visit there to open that year's Commonwealth Games. 

Other members of the Royal Family have also paid visits.

Royal symbols
From the beginning of Queen Elizabeth II's reign onwards, royal symbols in Jamaica were altered or new ones created to make them distinctly Jamaican, such as the augmentation of the coat of arms of Jamaica and the creation of Queen Elizabeth II's Personal Flag for Jamaica in 1962. Elizabeth II's personal flag for Jamaica was used in her former role as Queen of Jamaica, the first time being when she toured Jamaica in 1966. 

Queen Elizabeth II's Personal Jamaican Flag consisted of a banner of the coat of arms of Jamaica defaced with the Queen's royal cypher. The flag was white and bore a red St. George's Cross. A gold pineapple was superimposed on each arm of the cross. A blue disc with the royal cypher was placed in the centre of the cross. The disc was taken from the Queen's personal flag.

Public perception
Prior to the Queen's 2002 visit, the BBC reported that, "despite republican sentiments in the country, she was given an enthusiastic welcome." A poll taken that year showed 57 per cent of those who responded thought the Queen's tour of Jamaica, as part of her Golden Jubilee, was important.

Republicanism

Individuals in both major political parties in Jamaica have voiced support for making Jamaica a republic. In September 2003, then Prime Minister of Jamaica P. J. Patterson called for Jamaica to abolish the monarchy by 2007. Bruce Golding, while the prime minister and leader of the conservative Jamaica Labour Party, also pledged that Jamaica shall, "take steps to amend the constitution to replace the Queen with a Jamaican president who symbolises the unity of the nation", without elaborating on how a president would do so.

Prime Minister Portia Simpson-Miller expressed her intention to make Jamaica a republic to coincide with the country's 50th anniversary of independence in August 2012, but did not follow through with the proposed change, which would require the support of two-thirds of both houses in the Parliament of Jamaica to pass; Simpson-Miller's People's National Party had a two-thirds majority in the House of Representatives, but was one seat short in the Senate and would have needed the support of at least one senator from the opposition Jamaica Labour Party in order to have the constitutional reform approved. The current leader of the JLP, Andrew Holness, who succeeded Simpson-Miller as prime minister in 2016, has announced that the Cabinet will amend the constitution to make Jamaica a republic; specifically, the government has pledged to introduce a constitutional amendment to "replace Her Majesty the Queen with a non-executive president as head of state".

During the 2020 Jamaican general election, the opposition People's National Party promised to hold a referendum on becoming a republic within 18 months, if it won the election. Polls suggested that 55 per cent of respondents desired the country become a republic. However, the ruling Jamaica Labour Party was re-elected.

In June 2022, the Jamaican government announced its intention that Jamaica become a republic by the time of the next election in 2025.

List of Jamaican monarchs

See also

 Constitution of Jamaica
 Jamaican High Commission in London
 List of monarchies
 Monarchies in the Americas

References

External links 
King's Official website on Jamaica
The Monarch at jis.gov.jm
How To Address The Head of State at jis.gov.jm

Monarchy in Jamaica
Government of Jamaica
Politics of Jamaica
Jamaica
Heads of state of Jamaica
1962 establishments in Jamaica
Monarchies of North America
Kingdoms